Frodospira is an extinct genus of Lophospiridae, a family of extinct sea snails, fossil marine gastropod mollusks.   The genus is found in deposits of the Silurian age in Sweden. It was named in honor of the fictional character Frodo Baggins from J. R. R. Tolkien's The Lord of the Rings.

Species
The genus Frodospira contains the following four species:
 Frodospira cochleata (Lindström, 1884)
 Frodospira imbricata (Lindström, 1884)
 Frodospira munda (Lindström, 1884)
 Frodospira tortuosa (Lindström, 1884)

References

Fossil taxa described in 1999
Extinct gastropods
Organisms named after Tolkien and his works